BYL may refer to:

 BYL (airline), Moscow, Russia
 Barry Links railway station, Scotland, station code